Yordanis Arencibia Verdecia (born January 24, 1980) is a Cuban judoka.

At the 2004 Summer Olympics he won the bronze medal in the men's half-lightweight (66 kg) category, together with Georgi Georgiev of Bulgaria. He also won the bronze medal at the 2008 Summer Olympics with Pak Chol-Min of North Korea.

He has also won bronze medals at the 1999, 2001 and 2003 World Judo Championships.

References
 sports-reference
 Videos of Yordanis Arencibia (judovision.org)

External links
 

1980 births
Living people
Judoka at the 2000 Summer Olympics
Judoka at the 2004 Summer Olympics
Judoka at the 2008 Summer Olympics
Judoka at the 1999 Pan American Games
Judoka at the 2003 Pan American Games
Judoka at the 2007 Pan American Games
Olympic judoka of Cuba
Olympic bronze medalists for Cuba
Olympic medalists in judo
Medalists at the 2008 Summer Olympics
Medalists at the 2004 Summer Olympics
Cuban male judoka
Pan American Games gold medalists for Cuba
Pan American Games bronze medalists for Cuba
Pan American Games medalists in judo
Universiade medalists in judo
Central American and Caribbean Games gold medalists for Cuba
Competitors at the 2006 Central American and Caribbean Games
Universiade silver medalists for Cuba
Central American and Caribbean Games medalists in judo
Medalists at the 2003 Summer Universiade
Medalists at the 1999 Pan American Games
Medalists at the 2003 Pan American Games
Medalists at the 2007 Pan American Games
21st-century Cuban people